The Archbishop of Ohrid and Macedonia is the title given to the primate of the Macedonian Orthodox Church. The Archbishop of Ohrid and Macedonia exercises jurisdiction over Orthodox members in the Republic of North Macedonia and in exarchates in the diaspora. 

The current archbishop of Ohrid and Macedonia is Stefan Veljanovski, who was elected in 1999 following the passing of Archbishop Mihail Gogov.

History 
On 4 October 1958, the group of bishops in the SR Macedonia declared Dositej the "Archbishop of Ohrid, and Skopje, and Metropolitan of Macedonia" in Ohrid. Following the Communist regime's pressure, the Bishops' Council of the Serbian Orthodox Church retroactively recognized Dositej as the Metropolitan of Skopje on 19 June 1959. Despite the canonical order, Dositej and two other bishops established an "autonomous synod", which in order to preserve peace, was formalized by the Serbian Orthodox Assembly, after commitments that certain irregularities be removed. However, in an assembly in Ohrid on 19 July 1967, the autocephality of the Macedonian Orthodox Church was uncanonically proclaimed, the move not recognized by the Serbian Orthodox Church nor any other autocephalous church, leading to a  schism. Dositej and the other bishops of the schismatic Orthodox Church in Macedonia were indicted in the Serbian Orthodox Church court. In the following years there were repeated negotiations on settlement, but without results. Dositej continued to be considered a schismatic until his death.

On 16 May 2022, Archbishop Stefan became the first Archbishop of Ohrid to be canonically recognized since Dositej, owing to the resolution by the Holy Synod of the Serbian Orthodox Church to accept the canonical status of the Macedonian Orthodox Church.

List of archbishops of Ohrid and Macedonia

See also
 Archbishop of Ohrid
 Orthodox Ohrid Archbishopric

References

External links
 Official Website of the MOC 

Macedonian Orthodox Church
Ohrid
Lists of popes, primates, and patriarchs